Bengt Andersson Qvist (sometimes Benct Qvist or Bengt Quist (21 October 1726 – 14 October 1799) was a Swedish chemist and mineralogist. He was assistant of Sven Rinman and after a visit to steel plants in Britain he built a demonstration plant in Sweden.

In 1769, he was elected a member of the Royal Swedish Academy of Sciences.

References

1729 births
1799 deaths
Swedish chemists
Members of the Royal Swedish Academy of Sciences
18th-century Swedish people